This list of cemeteries in Florida includes currently operating, historical (closed for new interments), and defunct (graves abandoned or removed) cemeteries, columbaria, and mausolea which are historical and/or notable. It does not include pet cemeteries.

Alachua County 
 Evergreen Cemetery, Gainesville

Brevard County 
 Cape Canaveral National Cemetery, Mims
 Houston Pioneer Cemetery, Eau Gallie
 La Grange Church and Cemetery, Titusville
 Melbourne Cemetery, Melbourne
 Old St. Luke's Episcopal Church and Cemetery, Courteney

Broward County, Florida 
 Beth David Memorial Gardens, Hollywood
 Deerfield Beach Memorial Cemetery, Deerfield Beach
 Evergreen Cemetery, Fort Lauderdale
 Forest Lawn Memorial Gardens Central, Fort Lauderdale
 Forest Lawn Memorial Gardens North, Pompano Beach
 Forest Lawn Memorial Gardens South, Fort Lauderdale
 Fred Hunter's Hollywood Memorial Gardens East, Hollywood
 Fred Hunter's Hollywood Memorial Gardens North, Hollywood 
 Fred Hunter's Hollywood Memorial Gardens West, Hollywood
 Lauderdale Memorial Park, Fort Lauderdale
 Our Lady Queen of Heaven Cemetery, Fort Lauderdale
 Star of David Memorial Gardens, North Lauderdale
 Westview Cemetery, Pompano Beach

Calhoun County 
 Pine Memorial Cemetery, Blountstown

Charlotte County 
 Restlawn Memorial Gardens, Port Charlotte

Columbia County 
 Falling Creek Methodist Church and Cemetery, Lake City

Clay County 
 Jacksonville Memory Gardens, Orange Park
 Middleburg Methodist Church Cemetery, Middleburg
 Peoria Cemetery, Orange Park
 St. Margaret's Episcopal Church and Cemetery, Hibernia

Duval County 
 Edgewood Cemetery, Jacksonville
 Evergreen Cemetery, Jacksonville
 Jacksonville National Cemetery, Jacksonville
 Oaklawn Cemetery, Jacksonville
 Old City Cemetery, Jacksonville
 Riverside Memorial Park, Jacksonville

Escambia County 

 Barrancas National Cemetery, Pensacola
 Bayview Memorial Park, Pensacola 
 St. Michael's Cemetery, Pensacola

Hernando County 
 Fort Taylor Cemetery, Brooksville
 Spring Hill Cemetery, Brooksville

Highlands County 
 Fort Kissimmee Cemetery, Avon Park

Hillsborough County 
 American Legion Cemetery, Tampa
 Garden of Memories Cemetery, Tampa
 Myrtle Hill Memorial Park, Tampa
 Oaklawn Cemetery, Tampa
 Woodlawn Cemetery, Tampa, Florida

Jackson County 
 Marvin Chapel Cemetery, Graceville

Lake County 
 Greenwood Cemetery, Eustis

Lee County 
 Alva Cemetery, Alva

Leon County 
 Blackwood-Harwood Plantations Cemetery, Tallahassee
 Greenwood Cemetery, Tallahassee
 Southside Cemetery, Tallahassee

Levy County 
 Rosemary Hill Cemetery, Bronson

Madison County 
 Concord Cemetery, Greenville, Florida

Manatee County 
 Manasota Memorial Park, Bradenton

Marion County 
 Orange Springs Methodist Episcopal Church and Cemetery, Orange Springs
 Weirsdale Community Cemetery, Weirsdale, Florida

Martin County 
 All Saints Episcopal Church, Waveland, Jensen Beach
 Fernhill Memorial Gardens and Mausoleum, Stuart
 Forest Hills Memorial Park and Mausoleum, Palm City

Miami-Dade County 
 Caballero Rivero Woodlawn Park North Cemetery and Mausoleum, Miami
 City of Miami Cemetery, Miami
 Dade Memorial Park, Opa-Locka
 Flagler Memorial Park Cemetery, Miami
 Lakeside Memorial Park, Doral
 Miami Memorial Park Cemetery, Miami
 Mount Nebo Cemetery, Glenvar Heights
 Mount Nebo Miami Memorial Gardens, West Miami
 Neptune Memorial Reef, Key Biscayne
 Our Lady of the Rosary and Prayer Gardens Miami
 Our Lady of Mercy Catholic Cemetery, Miami 
 Southern Memorial Park, North Miami 
 Vista Memorial Gardens, Miami Lakes 
 Woodlawn Park Cemetery, Miami

Monroe County 
 Key West Cemetery, Key West

Nassau County 
 Bosque Bello Cemetery, Fernandina Beach

Orange County 
 Doctor Phillips Cemetery, Orlando
 Glen Haven Memorial Park and Mausoleum, Winter Park
 Greenwood Cemetery, Orlando
 Ocoee Cemetery, Ocoee
 Palm Cemetery, Winter Park
 Washington Park Cemetery, Orlando
 Winter Garden Cemetery, Winter Garden
 Woodlawn Memorial Park, Gotha

Palm Beach County 
 Bethesda Episcopal Church by the Sea Columbarium, Palm Beach
 Eternal Light Memorial Gardens, Boynton Beach
 The Gardens of Boca Raton, Boca Raton
 Hillcrest Memorial Park, West Palm Beach
 Our Lady Queen of Peace Cemetery, Royal Palm Beach
 Palm Beach Memorial Park, Lantana
 Pinecrest Cemetery, Lake Worth
 Riverside Memorial Park, Tequesta
 South Florida National Cemetery, Lake Worth 
 Star of David Cemetery, West Palm Beach
 Temple Beth El Mausoleum, Boca Raton
 Woodlawn Cemetery, West Palm Beach

Pasco County 
 Trinity Memorial Gardens, Trinity

Pinellas County 
 Calvary Catholic Cemetery and Mausoleum, Clearwater
 Curlew Hills Memory Gardens, Palm Harbor
 North Greenwood Cemetery, Clearwater
 St Matthews Cemetery, Clearwater
 Sylvan Abbey Memorial Park, Clearwater

Polk County 

 Oak Hill Cemetery, Bartow
 Oak Hill Burial Park, Lakeland
 Wildwood Cemetery, Bartow

Saint Johns County 
 Huguenot Cemetery, St. Augustine
 Memorial Presbyterian Church and Columbarium, St. Augustine
 Tolomato Cemetery, St. Augustine

Saint Lucie County 
 Garden of Heavenly Rest, Fort Pierce

Santa Rosa County 
 Serenity Gardens, Milton

Sarasota County 
 Palms Memorial Park, Sarasota
 Rosemary Cemetery, Sarasota
 Sarasota Memorial Park, Sarasota
 Venice Memorial Gardens, Venice Gardens

Seminole County 
 All Faiths Memorial Park, Casselberry 
 Concord Cemetery,  Casselberry 
 Page Jackson Cemetery, Sanford

Sumter County 
 Florida National Cemetery, Bushnell

Volusia County  
 Daytona Memorial Park, Daytona Beach
 Hillside Cemetery, Ormond Beach

Walton County 
 Gulf Cemetery, Santa Rosa Beach
 Magnolia Cemetery, DeFuniak Springs

Washington County 
 Glenwood Cemetery, Chipley

See also

 List of cemeteries in the United States

References

 

Florida